Snehamulla Simham is a 1986 Indian Malayalam-language romantic drama film produced by P. T. Xavier under Vijaya Movies, directed by Sajan and written by M. D. Ajayghosh. It stars Mammootty, Nalini, Mukesh and Lalu Alex in lead roles. The film features original songs composed by Shyam, cinematography was done by Anandakuttan. The film revolves around Maya, who falls in love with her professor, Vaishankaran. However, Vaishankaran, an alcoholic doesn't approve of her love. The film is based on the novel written by M. D. Ajayghosh.

Premise 
Maya (Nalini), a confident college student from a wealthy family falls for her recently joined professor Vaishakan (Mammootty). In a college arts festival, Vaishakan criticizes her poem and after that she takes a fancy to him.

Vaishakan from bad experiences in his personal life has become disillusioned, embittered, and anti-authoritarian and does not care much about his life. His fellow professor, Venu (Lalu Alex) an old friend who hasn't seen him in some time, encourages him to give up his alcoholism and pursue a stable family life.

Her family wish for her to marry Mohan (Mukesh) who is the son of a family friend and is considered by her family a suitable alliance. In the meantime, Vaisakhan has no interest in Maya's romantic feelings and clashes with her family.

The movie explores Vaishakan's background story and why he has become so embittered. It also explores the experience of a headstrong and confident young woman like Maya in a conventional Kerala household.

Cast 

Mammootty as M. A. Vaishakan
Nalini as Maya S. Menon
Mukesh as Mohan Menon
Lalu Alex as Venu
Priya as Lathika
Menaka as Vilasini Venu
Jose Prakash as Menon
Santhosh as Hari S. Menon
Mala Aravindan as Kuttan
Paravoor Bharathan as Karunakaran Pillai
Sukumari as Kamalamma
Prathapachandran as C. R.
Adoor Bhavani as Paruvamma
Unnimary as Sudha
K. P. A. C. Azeez as P. C. Kurup
Lalithasree as Cameo Appearance
Kollam Ajith as Cameo Appearance
Mamukkoya as Cameo Appearance

Soundtrack

Songs 
The music was composed by Shyam and the lyrics were written by Chunakkara Ramankutty.

Background Score 
The background score of this film won rave reviews from critics.

References

External links 
 

1986 films
1980s Malayalam-language films
Films based on Malayalam novels
Films directed by Sajan